This World Is Not My Home is a compilation album by American country rock band Lone Justice, released in January 1999 by Geffen. It contains tracks from their two studio albums, Lone Justice and Shelter, as well as several early demos and outtakes, including nine previously unreleased tracks.

Track listing
Adapted from the album's liner notes.

Notes Track 1 – demo session recorded in May 1983.
 Tracks 2, 3 and 4 – demo session recorded in December 1983 at Suite 16 Studios, Los Angeles, direct to two-track tape with no overdubs.
 Tracks 5 and 7 – outtakes from Lone Justice.  
 Track 12 – recorded live at Hartford Civic Center, Hartford, Connecticut, April 23, 1985.
 Tracks 16 and 17 – recorded live at the Ritz in New York City, February 19, 1987.

 Personnel 
Adapted from the album's liner notes.Lone JusticeMaria McKee – vocals, guitar [1, 3–5, 8, 12, 16], harmonica [6, 11], piano [17] 
Ryan Hedgecock – guitar [1–14], vocals [1, 3, 7, 8]
David Harrington – bass [1] 
Don Willens – drums [1]
Marvin Etzioni – bass [2–12], vocals [6, 8, 11], maracas [8]
Don Heffington – drums [2–12], vocals [8], maracas [8]
Tony Gilkyson – guitar [12] 
Shane Fontayne – guitar [13–17], baritone guitar [7]
Gregg Sutton – bass [13, 14, 16, 17], vocals [17] 
Bruce Brody – keyboards [13–17]
Rudy Richman – drums [13, 14, 16, 17]Additional personnelBenmont Tench – piano [6, 7, 9, 10, 15], organ [6–11], vocals [8]
Ron Wood – lead guitar [6]
Bob Dylan – rhythm guitar [6]
Mike Campbell – guitar [9]
Bob Glaub – bass [9]
Bobbye Hall – tambourine [9]
Bono – vocals [12]
Alexandra Brown – vocals [13]
Portia Griffin – vocals [13] 
Vesta Williams – vocals [13]Production'
Marvin Etzioni – producer [1], compilation, compilation producer
Jimmy Iovine – producer [5–11, 13–17]
Steven Van Zandt – producer [13–15]
Lone Justice – producer [13–15]
David Vaught – engineer [2–4]
Tony Ferguson – engineer [12]
Bernie Grundman – mastering
Jeff Magid – compilation, compilation producer
Maria McKee – compilation, compilation producer 
Ryan Hedgecock – compilation, compilation producer 
Don Heffington – compilation, compilation producer 
Valerie Pack – production coordinator
Janet Wolsborn – art direction
Chris Morris – liner notes

References

1999 compilation albums
Lone Justice albums
Albums produced by Jimmy Iovine
Albums produced by Steven Van Zandt
Geffen Records albums